Alejandro Puerto Díaz (born October 1, 1964) is a retired male wrestler from Cuba and Olympic champion in Freestyle wrestling.

Puerto competed at the 1992 Summer Olympics in Barcelona where he won a gold medal in the men's freestyle wrestling event, the bantamweight class.

References

External links

1964 births
Living people
Olympic wrestlers of Cuba
Wrestlers at the 1992 Summer Olympics
Wrestlers at the 1996 Summer Olympics
Cuban male sport wrestlers
Olympic gold medalists for Cuba
Olympic medalists in wrestling
World Wrestling Champions
Medalists at the 1992 Summer Olympics
Pan American Games gold medalists for Cuba
Pan American Games silver medalists for Cuba
Pan American Games bronze medalists for Cuba
Pan American Games medalists in wrestling
Wrestlers at the 1983 Pan American Games
Wrestlers at the 1987 Pan American Games
Wrestlers at the 1991 Pan American Games
Wrestlers at the 1995 Pan American Games
Medalists at the 1983 Pan American Games
People from Pinar del Río